John Jasper Ingram (December 19, 1893 – December 14, 1957) was a Canadian professional ice hockey player. He played one game in the National Hockey League with the Boston Bruins on January 5, 1925 against the Toronto St. Pats. The rest of his career, which lasted from 1912 to 1931, was mainly spent in the Maritime senior leagues.

Career 
A native of Halifax, Nova Scotia, Ingram played the position of centre. Ingram played for the Charlottetown Islanders from 1912 to 1913, Moncton CNR Machinists from 1913 to 1915, Moncton St. Bernard's from 1915 to 1917, Moncton Trojans from 1915 to 1916, Moncton Victorias from 1918 to 1925. Boston Bruins in 1925, Providence Reds from 1926 to 1927, Moncton Atlantics from 1928 to 1930, and the Moncton Victorias from 1930 to 1931. Ingram retired from playing hockey in 1931, but continued to be a coach for both senior and junior hockey teams in New Brunswick.

Personal life 
Ingram died in Moncton, New Brunswick, in December 1957 at the age of 63.

Career statistics

Regular season and playoffs

Notes

Bibliography

See also
List of players who played only one game in the NHL

External links

1893 births
1957 deaths
Boston Bruins players
Canadian ice hockey centres
Ice hockey people from Nova Scotia
Maritime Major Hockey League players
Providence Reds players
Sportspeople from Halifax, Nova Scotia
Canadian expatriate ice hockey players in the United States